Kim Soon-Duk (born 20 December 1967) is a South Korean former field hockey player who competed in the 1988 Summer Olympics.

References

External links
 

1967 births
Living people
South Korean female field hockey players
Olympic field hockey players of South Korea
Field hockey players at the 1988 Summer Olympics
Olympic silver medalists for South Korea
Olympic medalists in field hockey
Medalists at the 1988 Summer Olympics
Asian Games medalists in field hockey
Field hockey players at the 1986 Asian Games
Field hockey players at the 1990 Asian Games
Asian Games gold medalists for South Korea
Medalists at the 1986 Asian Games
Medalists at the 1990 Asian Games